Nareshwar was a village development committee in Gorkha District in the Gandaki Zone of northern-central Nepal. It was merged into Gorkha Municipality in 2014. At the time of the 1991 Nepal census it had a population of 4,309 and had 867 houses in the town.

References

Populated places in Gorkha District